Sultanovka (Soltan) is a rural locality (a village) in Rayevsky Selsoviet, Davlekanovsky District, Bashkortostan, Russia. The population was 12 as of 2010. There is 1 street.

Geography 
Sultanovka is located 25 km southeast of Davlekanovo (the district's administrative centre) by road. Komintern is the nearest rural locality.

References 

Rural localities in Davlekanovsky District